The Canton of Troyes-4 is a canton of the Aube department, in northern France. Since the French canton reorganisation which came into effect in March 2015, the communes of the canton of Troyes-4 are:
Pont-Sainte-Marie
Saint-Julien-les-Villas
Saint-Parres-aux-Tertres
Troyes (partly)

References

Troyes-4
Troyes